Ten Spot may refer to:

Ten Spot, Kentucky, an unincorporated community in Harlan County
10 Spot, a defunct programming block on MTV
Slang for the United States ten-dollar bill, see Slang terms for money